Noble Dancer (1972 – June 27, 1994) was a British-born Thoroughbred racehorse who won back-to-back runnings of the Oslo Cup in Norway enroute to earning Horse of the Year honors. In 1976 he was sent to compete in the United States where he was a dominant turf runner whose multiple top-level wins included back-to-back runnings of the Grade 1 United Nations Handicap as well as the San Luis Rey Stakes

Racing career
Noble Dancer raced in England at age two where he was trained by Gordon Smyth who had won the 1966 Epsom Derby with Charlottown. Noble Dancer's most significant result was a second place finish in the August 17, 1974 Washington Singer Stakes at Newbury Racecourse. Under the ownership of Haakon Fretheim, an American-based Norwegian shipping executive, in Norway Noble Dancer was trained by former steeplechase jockey, Terje Dahl. Among his important wins there were the 1975 Norsk St. Leger and the Oslo Cup in both 1975 and 1976. Called "the best horse in Norwegian history" by the New York Times, in November of 1976 Noble Dancer was sent to the United States to compete in the Grade 1 Washington D.C. International Stakes at Laurel Park in Laurel, Maryland where he ran fourth to Youth. Remaining in the United States, due to a duplicate name he had to be registered as Noble Dancer II. His training was handled by future U.S. Racing Hall of Fame inductee Tommy Kelly. Noble Dancer competed and won at racetracks from coast-to-coast in the United States until he suffered a career-ending leg injury on October 17, 1979 while training at Belmont Park. The $8,222 bargain-basement purchase was retired to stud having earned $939,215 of which $856,245 was in North America. As a sire, Noble Dancer met with modest success.

Pedigree

References

1972 racehorse births
1994 racehorse deaths
Thoroughbred family 2-e
Racehorses bred in the United Kingdom
Racehorses trained in Norway
Racehorses trained in the United Kingdom
Racehorses trained in the United States